Mountain Rhythm may refer to:
 Mountain Rhythm (1939 film), an American Western film
 Mountain Rhythm (1943 film), an American comedy film